The ninth European Parliament was elected in the 2019 elections and is to last until the 2024 elections.

Major events 

23–26 May 2019
Elections to the 9th European Parliament.
EPP (182 seats), S&D (154), RE (108), Greens/EFA (74), ID (73), ECR (62), GUE/NGL (41), others (54).
2 July 2019
First Session (constitutive session) of the 9th Parliament.
Presiding officer (under Article 14(2) of the Rules): Antonio Tajani (EPP) of Italy, President of the Eighth Parliament.
3 July 2019
Election of the President and Vice-Presidents of Parliament for the first half of the parliamentary term.
David Sassoli (S&D) of Italy is elected President, Mairead McGuinness (EPP) of Ireland is elected First Vice-President.
16 July 2019
Vote on 3 July 2019 EUCO proposal for President of the European Commission.
Ursula von der Leyen (EPP) of Germany is elected President of the European Commission.
30 September-8 October 2019
Hearings of candidates for European Commissioners. 
Additional hearings, if needed, would take place on 14 and 15 October 2019.
23 October 2019 
Confirmation vote on the Von der Leyen Commission.
31 October 2019 (postponed)
Original scheduled date for the United Kingdom to withdraw from the European Union, but has been agreed to be postponed for 3 months.
As Brexit is further postponed, the UK will have to nominate a candidate for a European Commissioner.
1 November 2019
New European Commission takes office.
31 January 2020
The United Kingdom withdrew from the European Union, subsequently resulting in a reduction in the number of seats in the European Parliament from 751 to 705.
12 November 2020
Roberta Metsola (EPP) of Malta is elected First Vice-President, replacing Mairead McGuinness who has taken the role of European Commissioner.
16 December 2020
Approval of the seven-year budget 2021-2027 of the EU. Decision on keeping an eye on how Next Generation EU funds are spent.
11 January 2022
 Death in office of President David Sassoli.
 First Vice-President Roberta Metsola takes the role of Acting President of the European Parliament till the election of a new president.
18 January 2022
Election of the President and Vice-Presidents of Parliament for the second half of the parliamentary term.
Roberta Metsola (EPP) of Malta is elected President, Othmar Karas (EPP) of Austria is elected First Vice-President

Leadership

First Half

Second Half

Elections of the President

3 July 2019 election 

The President was due to be elected at the first meeting of Parliament on 2 July but the vote was delayed until 3 July because of the European Council's ongoing negotiations to fill other major EU roles. Nominations for candidates remained open until late in the evening on 2 July. The President is elected with the majority of valid votes.

18 January 2022 election

Elections of the Vice Presidents 
The 14 Vice Presidents are elected in a single ballot by an absolute majority of votes cast. If the number of successful candidates is less than 14, a second vote is held to assign the remaining seats under the same conditions. If a third vote is necessary, a simple majority is sufficient to fill the remaining seats. Vice Presidents take precedence in the order in which they are elected and, in the event of a tie, by age. At each round, MEPs may vote for as many candidates as the number of seats available at that round, but they have to vote for more than half of the positions to be filled.

3 July 2019 election

18 January 2022 election

Elections of the Quaestors

4 July 2019 election 
The five Quaestors were chosen by acclamation.

20 January 2022 election 
Four Quaestors were elected on the first round of voting, with the fifth being elected on the second round of voting.

Political groups leadership

Political groups and parties 

There are currently 7 political groups in the parliament, one less than the previous parliament. Each MEP can belong to only one group. Political groups can be founded by at least 25 MEPs which come from at least one quarter of all EU member states (currently seven).

Current situation

Members

List of members 

MEPs that previously served as President or Prime Minister:
 Andrus Ansip of Estonia: Prime Minister (2005–2014)
 Traian Băsescu of Romania: President (2004–2014)
 Marek Belka of Poland: Prime Minister (2004–2005)
 Silvio Berlusconi of Italy: Prime Minister (1994–1995, 2001–2006, 2008–2011)
 Jerzy Buzek of Poland: Prime Minister (1997–2001)
 Włodzimierz Cimoszewicz of Poland: Prime Minister (1996–1997)
 Dacian Cioloș of Romania: Prime Minister (2015–2017)
 Ewa Kopacz of Poland: Prime Minister (2014–2015)
 Andrius Kubilius of Lithuania: Prime Minister (1999–2000, 2008–2012)
 Leszek Miller of Poland: Prime Minister (2001–2004)
 Alfred Sant of Malta: Prime Minister (1996–1998)
 Sergei Stanishev of Bulgaria: Prime Minister (2005–2009)
 Beata Szydło of Poland: Prime Minister (2015–2017)
 Mihai Tudose of Romania: Prime Minister (2017–2018)
 Guy Verhofstadt of Belgium: Prime Minister (1999–2008)

MEPs that previously served as European Commissioner:
 Andrus Ansip of Estonia: Vice President, Digital Single Market (2014–2019)
 Dacian Cioloș of Romania: Agriculture and Rural Development (2010–2014)
 Corina Crețu of Romania: Regional Policy (2014–2019)
 Danuta Hübner of Poland: Trade (2004), Regional Policy (2004–2009)
 Sandra Kalniete of Latvia: Agriculture and Fisheries (2004)
 Janusz Lewandowski of Poland: Financial Programming and the Budget (2010–2014)
 Antonio Tajani of Italy: Transport (2008–2010), Industry and Entrepreneurship (2010–2014)

MEPs that previously served as presiding officer of a national parliament:
 Vasile Blaga of Romania: President of the Senate (2011–2012)
 Milan Brglez of Slovenia: Speaker of the National Assembly (2014–2018)
 Włodzimierz Cimoszewicz of Poland: Marshal of the Sejm (2005)
 Eero Heinäluoma of Finland: Speaker of Parliament (2011–2015)
 Vangelis Meimarakis of Greece: Speaker of Parliament (2012–2015)
 Radosław Sikorski of Poland: Marshal of the Sejm (2014–2015)

MEPs that previously served as President of the European Parliament:
 Jerzy Buzek of Poland: President (2009–2012)
 Antonio Tajani of Italy: President (2017–2019)

MEPs that previously served as foreign minister:
 Włodzimierz Cimoszewicz of Poland: Minister of Foreign Affairs (2001–2005)
 Anna Fotyga of Poland: Minister of Foreign Affairs (2006–2007)
 José Manuel García-Margallo of Spain: Minister of Foreign Affairs and Cooperation (2011–2016)
 Marina Kaljurand of Estonia: Minister of Foreign Affairs (2015–2016)
 Sandra Kalniete of Latvia: Minister of Foreign Affairs (2002–2004)
 Sven Mikser of Estonia: Minister of Foreign Affairs (2016–2019)
 Urmas Paet of Estonia: Minister of Foreign Affairs (2005–2014)
 Tonino Picula of Croatia: Minister of Foreign Affairs (2000–2003)
 Radosław Sikorski of Poland: Minister of Foreign Affairs (2007–2014)
 Witold Waszczykowski of Poland: Minister of Foreign Affairs (2015–2018)

Seat allocations 
When the United Kingdom left the EU, 27 seats were reallocated to the other member states and the other 46 seats were abolished, for a total of 705 MEPs.

Post-Brexit political groups membership changes

Former members

Elected MEPs that did not take the seat

Working bodies

Standing committees 
MEPs are divided up among 20 standing committees. Each MEP is usually member of one committee and a substitute member of another. Committees discuss legislative proposals from the Commission before the European Parliament decides on them in plenary session. The European Parliament has an equal role to the Council of the EU in the ordinary legislative procedure, which is usually used in decision-making process at the EU level.

Each committee elects its chair and vice chairs to lead the work of the committee. Committee chairs are members of the Conference of Committee Chairs, which coordinates the work of all the committees.

Other bodies

Composition of the executive

Appointment of the new executive 
On 2 July 2019 European Council finished a three-day-long summit with a decision to propose the following for approval by the Parliament:
 Ursula von der Leyen (EPP) for President
 Josep Borrell (PES) for High Representative

European Parliament confirmed Ursula von Der Leyen as President of the European Commission on 16 July 2019.

On the same summit Charles Michel (ALDE), incumbent Prime Minister of Belgium was elected a new President of the European Council and President of Euro Summit for a 2.5 years term.

President of the Commission Confirmation 
Secret paper ballot took place on 16 July 2019.

Von der Leyen Commission Confirmation 
Following the election of the new President of the Commission, President-elect called upon member states to propose candidates for European Commissioners. The President-elect, in agreement with the European Council, assigned to each proposed candidate a portfolio, and the Council sent the list of candidates to the European Parliament. Candidates were then questioned about their knowledge of the assigned portfolio and confirmed by European Parliament Committees. When all of the candidates were confirmed by the respective committee, European Parliament took a vote of confirmation of the new European Commission in the plenary session. European Commission was then officially appointed by the European Council using qualified majority. Commissioners took the oath of office before the Court of Justice of the EU before officially taking office.

Commissioners-designate Confirmations 
The responsible committee held a 3-hour hearing of the Commissioner-designate to examine the candidate's competence and suitability. Committee decided if candidate is suitable to become a European Commissioner and if their knowledge of the portfolio is sufficient. After each hearing, the committee voted on the candidate. Decisions of the committee were first taken by the coordinators of the EP political groups, at this point each candidate needed support of 2/3 of coordinators, if support was reached, the candidate was confirmed. If such support was not reached, then committee as a whole took a vote on a Commissioner-designate, where a candidate needed the support of the majority of committee members. If candidate was rejected by the committee as well, President-elect could propose a new candidate, in which case a new hearing would take place for a new candidate. Coordinators could also decide to hold additional hearing of 1.5 hours or demand additional written answers. If there were more committees hearing one candidate, all committees would give a joint evaluation.

The first round of hearings took place from 30 September until 8 October 2019, followed by the evaluation by the BCPR (Conference of Presidents) on 15 October 2019. If any of the candidates would be rejected by the responsible committee, new hearings would take place on 14 and 15 October 2019, followed by BCPR evaluation on 16 October 2019. BCPR closed hearings process on 17 October 2019. Before the hearings begin, Committee on Legal Affairs, on 19 September 2019, examined if there was a possibility of a conflict of interests for any of the candidates for commissioners.

The United Kingdom, which had been expected to leave the EU on 31 October 2019, did not nominate a candidate for commissioner.

It was reported by Euractiv on 26 September 2019 that commissioners-designate László Trócsányi of Hungary (Neighbourhood and Enlargement) and Rovana Plumb of Romania (Transport) will be questioned by the European Parliament Legal Affairs Committee about their declarations of interests due to potential conflict of interests and "discrepancies in property statements". Other commissioners-designate were approved by the Committee, including Didier Reynders of Belgium (Justice) and Sylvie Goulard of France (Internal Market) who are under investigation by respective national authorities due to corruption allegations or misuse of EU money, according to one of the MEPs because the Committee does not have the authority to question candidates beyond facts stated in the declarations od interests. Euractiv also reports that Janusz Wojciechowski of Poland (Agriculture) might as well be questioned by the Committee. Euractiv reported later that day that Rovana Plumb of Romania was rejected as a European Commissioner-designate by 10 votes to 6 (with 2 abstentions). Hungarian Commissioner-designate László Trócsányi was rejected on 26 September as well by 11 votes to 9 due to his personal finances in connection with his law firm, he founded before becoming Minister of Justice and due to concerns about "connections to Russia" in relation to extradition of Russian suspects to Russia. It is up to the President-elect Ursula von der Leyen to take further decisions on candidates, while JURI approval is a necessary precondition for hearings to take place. This was the first time that candidates have been rejected by the JURI Committee.

Following the JURI Committee decision to reject László Trócsányi, he published a statement on his Twitter account later that day, stating that he will take all legal steps against the decision. This could have an impact on the process of formation of the new European Commission which is due to take office on 1 November 2019.

The Legal Affairs Committee was asked to decide on both rejected candidates again and on 30 September 2019 JURI again rejected both of the candidates, Plumb with 13 votes to 7 and Trócsányi with 12 votes to 9. Following the vote, President-elect Von der Leyen asked the national governments of Romania and Hungary to propose new candidates. Hungary already proposed a new candidate Olivér Várhelyi, its Permanent Representative to the EU.

According to several media reports hearings before the European Parliament committees could be tough for:

 Janusz Wojciechowski - European Commissioner-designate for Agriculture (due to ongoing investigation by OLAF regarding irregularities in the reimbursement of travel expenses when he was MEP; it was reported on 27 September by Politico that OLAF dropped investigation because Wojciechowski already paid the money back to the European Parliament)
 Didier Reynders - European Commissioner-designate for Justice (due to investigation by the national authorities regarding corruption and money laundering in the Democratic Republic of Congo; it was reported by Politico on 27 September 2019 that Belgian prosecutor dropped the investigation against Reynders and found no wrongdoing)
 Sylvie Goulard - European Commissioner-designate for Internal Market (due to alleged misuse of EU funds)
 Paolo Gentiloni - European Commissioner-designate for Economy (due to his role in Italian economy as Prime Minister)
 Dubravka Šuica - Vice-President-designate for Democracy and Demography (due to personal finances and possession of many real estate worth more than 5 million euros in light of her work as teacher, mayor and MP, and due to her views on women's rights, especially freedom of birth and due to her past votings as MEP where she objected abortion)

Schedule of the hearings 

Coordinators of political groups in the responsible committees decided that additional written answers will be requested by and potentially additional hearing of 1.5 hours should be held for:
 Janusz Wojciechowski of  Poland, European Commissioner-designate for Agriculture (additional hearing on 8 October 2019)
 Sylvie Goulard of France, European Commissioner-designate for Internal Market (additional hearing on 10 October 2019)
 Ylva Johansson of Sweden, European Commissioner-designate for Home Affairs

Hearings

Rejected candidates

Council presidency 

The Council of the European Union (Council) is one of three EU institutions involved in the EU lawmaking process. It is the de facto upper house of the EU legislature, the European Parliament being the lower house, with an equal role in the ordinary legislative procedure. The Council consists of ministerial representatives from member states' national governments. Votes are decided by qualified majority (55% of member states and 65% of EU population).

Every six months, a new EU member state takes over the presidency of the Council. As presiding country, it organises Council meetings (with the help of Secretariat General) and decides on their agendas. These agendas are prepared in cooperation with other two member states that are part of each trio, which form common policy agendas over their 18-month period.

{|class="wikitable"
|+
! colspan="11" align="center" |Presidency of the Council of the European Union
! rowspan="42" style="width:1px;" |
! rowspan="2" style="width:50px;"|Parliament
! rowspan="2" style="width:60px;"|Commission
! colspan="3" rowspan="2" |High RepresentativeFAC President
! colspan="3" rowspan="2" |European Council
|-
!style="width:80px;"|Member state
!style="width:30px;"|Trio
!style="width:100px;"|Term
!colspan=3 |Head of Government
!style="width:50px;"|Cabinet
!colspan=4 |Government coalition
|-
|rowspan=2 style="width:90px;"|
| rowspan="15" align="center" style="width:30px;"|T9
|rowspan=2 style="width:90px;"|
|rowspan=2 style="width:1px; background-color: " |
|rowspan=2 style="width:30px"|
|rowspan=2 style="width:140px"|
|rowspan=2 style="width:50px" align="center" |
|style="width:1px; background-color: " |
|style="width:30px"|
|style="width:1px; background-color: " |
|style="width:30px"|
| rowspan="3" align=center style="width:50px;"|VIII
| rowspan="7" align="center" style="width:60px;" |Juncker
| rowspan="7" style="width:1px; background-color: " |
| rowspan="7" style="width:30px;" |
| rowspan="7" style="width:50px;" |Federica Mogherini
| rowspan="7" style="background-color:" |
| rowspan="7" style="width:30px;"|
| rowspan="7" style="width:50px;"|Donald Tusk
|-
|style="width:1px; background-color:#808080" |
|style="width:30px"|
|style="width:1px; background-color: " |
|style="width:30px"|
|-
| rowspan="11" style="width:90px;"|
| rowspan="11" style="width:90px;"|
| rowspan="11" style="width:1px; background-color: " |
| rowspan="11" style="width:30px" |
| rowspan="6" style="width:100px" |
| rowspan="6" align="center" style="width:50px;"|
|style="width:1px; background-color: " |
|style="width:30px"|
|style="width:1px; background-color: " |
|style="width:30px"|
|-
|style="width:1px; background-color: " |
|style="width:30px"|
|style="width:1px; background-color: " |
|style="width:30px"|
| rowspan="36" align="center" style="width:50px;" |IX
|-
|style="width:1px; background-color: " |
|style="width:30px"|
|style="width:1px; background-color: #61BF1A" |
|style="width:30px"|
|-
|style="width:1px; background-color: " |
|style="width:30px"|
|style="width:1px; background-color: " |
|style="width:30px"|
|-
| rowspan="2" style="width:1px; background-color: " |
| rowspan="2" style="width:30px;"|
| rowspan="2" style="width:1px; background-color: #0E88D3" |
| rowspan="2" |
|-
| rowspan="32" |Von der Leyen
| rowspan="32" style="width:1px; background-color: " |
| rowspan="32" |
| rowspan="32" |Josep Borrell
| rowspan="32" style="width:1px; background-color: " |
| rowspan="32" style="width:30px;" |
| rowspan="32" |Charles Michel
|-
| rowspan="5" |
| rowspan="5" align="center" style="width:50px;"|Marin
|style="width:1px; background-color: " |
|style="width:30px;"|
|style="width:1px; background-color: " |
|style="width:30px;"|
|-
|style="width:1px; background-color: " |
|style="width:30px;"|
|style="width:1px; background-color: " |
|style="width:30px;"|
|-
|style="width:1px; background-color: " |
|style="width:30px;"|
|style="width:1px; background-color: " |
|
|-
|style="width:1px; background-color: " |
|style="width:30px;"|
|style="width:1px; background-color: #61BF1A" |
|style="width:30px;"|
|-
|style="width:1px; background-color: " |
|style="width:30px;"|
|style="width:1px; background-color: #0E88D3" |
|style="width:30px;"|
|-
| rowspan="2" style="width:90px;"|
| rowspan="2" style="width:90px;"|
| rowspan="2" style="background-color:" |
| rowspan="2" style="width:30px;"|
| rowspan="2" |Prime MinisterAndrej Plenković (HDZ)
| rowspan="2" align="center" style="width:50px;"|Plenković
| style="background-color:" |
|style="width:30px;"|
| style="width:1px; background-color: " |
|style="width:30px;"|HDZ
|-
| style="width:1px; background-color: " |
|style="width:30px;"|
| style="width:1px; background-color: " |
|HNS
|-
| rowspan="3" style="width:90px;"|
| rowspan="8" align="center" style="width:30px;"|
| rowspan="3" style="width:90px;"|
| rowspan="3" style="background-color:" |
| rowspan="3" style="width:30px;"|
| rowspan="3" |Federal ChancellorAngela Merkel (CDU)
| rowspan="3" align=center style="width:50px;"|Merkel IV
| style="width:1px; background-color:" |
|style="width:30px;"|
| style="width:1px; background-color: " |
|style="width:30px;"|CDU
|-
| style="width:1px; background-color: " |
|style="width:30px;"|
| style="width:1px; background-color: " |
|style="width:30px;"|SPD
|-
| style="background-color:" |
|style="width:30px;"|
| style="width:1px; background-color: " |
|style="width:30px;"|CSU
|-
| style="width:90px;"|
| style="width:90px;"|
| style="background-color: " |
| style="width:30px;"|
| Prime MinisterAntónio Costa (PS)
| align=center style="width:50px;"|Costa II
| style="width:1px; background-color: " |
|style="width:30px;"|
| style="width:1px; background-color: " |
|style="width:30px;"|PS
|-
| rowspan="4" style="width:90px;"|
| rowspan="4" style="width:90px;"|
| rowspan="4" style="background-color:" |
| rowspan="4" style="width:30px;"|
| rowspan="4" |Prime MinisterJanez Janša (SDS)
| rowspan="4" align=center style="width:50px;" |Janša III
| style="width:1px; background-color: " |
| style="width:30px;"|
| style="width:1px; background-color: " |
| style="width:30px;"|SDS
|-
| style="width:1px; background-color: " |
|style="width:30px;"|
| style="width:1px; background-color: " |
|style="width:30px;"|SMC
|-
| style="width:1px; background-color: " |
|style="width:30px;"|
| style="width:1px; background-color: " |
|style="width:30px;"|NSi
|-
| style="width:1px; background-color: " |
|style="width:30px;"|
| style="width:1px; background-color: " |
| style="width:30px;"|DeSUS
|-
| rowspan="6" style="width:90px;" |
| rowspan="14" align="center" style="width:30px;" || rowspan="6" style="width:90px;" |
| rowspan="6" style="width:1px; background-color:#808080" |
| rowspan="6" |Ind.
| rowspan="6" |Prime Minister Jean Castex (DVD-EC)
| rowspan="6" align="center"|Castex
| style="width:1px; background-color:#808080" |
| Ind.
| style="width:1px; background-color: " |
|LREM
|-
|style="width:1px; background-color:#808080" |
|Ind.
| style="width:1px; background-color: " |
|TDP
|-
|style="width:1px; background-color:#808080" |
|Ind.
| style="width:1px; background-color: " |
|EC
|-
| style="width:1px; background-color: " |
|EDP
| style="width:1px; background-color: " |
|MoDem
|-
| style="width:1px; background-color: " |
|ALDE
| style="width:1px; background-color: " |
|RAD
|-
|style="width:1px; background-color:#808080" |
|Ind.
| style="width:1px; background-color: " |
|Agir
|-
| rowspan="5" style="width:90px;"|
| rowspan="5" style="width:90px;"|
| rowspan="5" style="width:1px; background-color: " |
| rowspan="5" |ECR
| rowspan="5" |Prime MinisterPetr Fiala (ODS)
| rowspan="5" align="center" style="width:50px;" |Fiala
| style="width:1px; background-color:  |
| ECR
| style="width:1px; background-color:  |
| ODS
|-
| style="width:1px; background-color:  |
| EPP
| style="width:1px; background-color:  |
| STAN
|-
| style="width:1px; background-color:  |
| EPP
| style="width:1px; background-color:  |
| KDU-ČSL
|-
| style="width:1px; background-color:  |
| PPEU
| style="width:1px; background-color:  |
| Pirates
|-
| style="width:1px; background-color:  |
| EPP
| style="width:1px; background-color:  |
| TOP 09
|-
|rowspan="3" style="width:90px;"|
|rowspan="3" style="width:90px;"|
|rowspan="3" style="width:1px; background-color: " |
|rowspan="3" |EPP
|rowspan="3" |Prime MinisterUlf Kristersson(M)
|rowspan="3" |Kristersson
| style="width:1px; background-color:  |
| EPP
| style="width:1px; background-color:  |
| M
|-
| style="width:1px; background-color:  |
| EPP
| style="width:1px; background-color:  |
| KD
|-
| style="width:1px; background-color:  |
| ALDE
| style="width:1px; background-color:  |
| L
|-
|style="width:90px;"|
| rowspan="5" align="center" style="width:30px;"|
|style="width:90px;"|
|colspan=3 |
|
| colspan="5" |
|-
|style="width:90px;"|
|style="width:90px;"|
|colspan=3 |
|TBD
| colspan="5" |
|-
|rowspan="3" style="width:90px;"|
|rowspan="3" style="width:90px;"|
|colspan="3" rowspan="3" |
|rowspan="3" |
|colspan="4" rowspan="3" |
| rowspan="25" align="center" style="width:50px;|X
|
| colspan="3" |
| colspan="3" |
|}

 Appointments 
European Parliament has role in the appointment of:

President of the European Commission
Members of the European Commission
Members of the European Court of Auditors
Members of the Executive Board of the European Central Bank and Supervisory Board of the European Central Bank
economic governance bodies:
Chair and Vice Chair of the Supervisory Board of the Single Supervisory Mechanism
Chair, Vice Chair and full-time members of the Single Resolution Board of the Single Resolution Mechanism
Chairs and Executive Directors of the European Supervisory Authorities (European Banking Authority, European Securities and Markets Authority, European Insurance and Occupational Pensions Authority)
Managing Director and Deputy Managing Director of the European Fund for Strategic Investments

 Statistics 
 European Parliament statistics 
There are 266 women MEPs, 37.7% of the whole Parliament. Kira Peter-Hansen of Denmark is the youngest MEP at 21, while Silvio Berlusconi (former Prime Minister of Italy), is the oldest at the age of 82. The average age of all MEPs is 50.

387 of current MEPs is newly elected and weren't members of European Parliament before. 295 MEPs were also members of the previous Parliament. 16 of current MEPs held position before, but not between 2014 and 2019.

 Statistics by member states 
Most bureau positions is held by Germany, while on the other side Slovenia is the only member state that has no bureau positions. With 5, Germany has most Committee Chairmen, followed by France with 4.

Finland (with 7 women out of 13 MEPs) and Sweden (with 11 out of 20) are the only member states with more women MEPS than men. Austria, Latvia, Luxembourg, the Netherlands and Slovenia have a gender parity. Cyprus is the only member state without any women.

Slovakia has the highest percent of newly elected MEPs at 85%, while Malta only has 33% of newly elected MEPs.

With 60 years of age Lithuania has the oldest national delegation, while Malta has the youngest at 44. Sweden has the youngest "oldest" MEP at the age of 58 and Lithuania has the oldest "youngest" MEP at the age of 54.

 Delegations 
Delegations are established to maintain and develop relations with entities the European Parliament has an interest to cooperate with. Among these are countries that EU has close (especially trade) relations or countries applying expected to join the EU. The EP also cooperates with the parliamentary bodies of other international organisations, such as NATO. Delegations have full and substitute members, and elects its own chair. They can be divided in two groups, standing delegations and ad hoc delegations.

 Delegations to parliamentary assemblies 

 Joint Parliamentary Committees (JPCs) 
JPCs are created with bilateral agreement between the EU and the third country.

 Parliamentary Cooperations Committees (PCCs) 

 Bilateral and multilateral relations delegations 

 Secretariat 

The composition of the rest of Secretariat is appointed by the Parliament Bureau, headed by the Secretary General.

Secretary General:  Klaus Welle
Deputy Secretary General:  Markus Winkler
The Cabinet of the Secretary General
Director:  Susanne Altenberg
Legal Service
Head:  Freddy Drexler
Directorates General.

Other services that assist the Secretariat:
Secretariat of the Bureau and Quaestors
Secretariat of the Conference of Presidents
Directorate for Relations with Political Groups
Internal Audit Unit
Eco-Management and Audit Scheme Unit (EMAS)
Management Team Support Office
Business Continuity Management Unit
Data Protection Service

 Directorates General 

 2019 elections results 
The 2019 European Parliament election took place from 23 to 26 May 2019.Notes on changes in groups'''
Alliance of Liberals and Democrats for Europe was succeeded by Renew Europe.
Europe of Nations and Freedom was disbanded and largely replaced by Identity and Democracy.
Europe of Freedom and Direct Democracy did not form in the Ninth Parliament.

Results by country

Notes

References

External websites 
European Parliament

 9
2020s in Europe